Reino Lehto's cabinet was the 47th government of Republic of Finland. Cabinet's time period was from December 18, 1963 to October 12, 1964. It is the longest caretaker government in Finnish history.

Lehto
1963 establishments in Finland
1964 disestablishments in Finland
Cabinets established in 1963
Cabinets disestablished in 1964